ABD, or abd, may refer to:

 Abd, Iran, a village in Surak Rural District
 Abd (Arabic), a word ('slave/servant' or 'to worship') oft within anthroponyms
 Mohammadabad, Jask (also ‘Abd), a village in Hormozgan Province, Iran

Acronyms and codes
 ABD AB de Villiers (b. 1984), former international cricketer
 ABD Av Beit Din, Sanhedrin chief justice in antiquity
 abd, the ISO 639-3 code for the Manide language, Philippines
 Anza-Borego Desert, part of California's Colorado Desert
 Aberdeenshire (historic), registration county of Scotland (Chapman code:ABD)

Transport
 ABD, the IATA code for Abadan International Airport in Iran
 ABD, the National Rail code for Aberdeen railway station, Scotland, UK

Medicine 
 Acute behavioural disturbance, an umbrella diagnosis for behavior requiring chemical restraint

Other uses
 ABD (TV station), Darwin, Northern Territory, Australia
 ABD Insurance & Financial,  California, US
 All but dissertation, a stage in a higher degree
 Anchor Bible Dictionary

See also